The Lorenzen group (Danish: Lorenzengruppen) was an armed paramilitary group of Danish collaborators, subordinate to the HIPO Corps, which was active during the period December 1944 - May 1945.

The group is named after its founder Jørgen Lorenzen, who in 1944 began service in the Nazi German secret police and created the group as section 9c to the HIPO Corps. The group were ordered mainly to fight the Danish resistance movement.

The group performed numerous murders and accounted for 600-800 arrests of suspected resistance fighters and often took advantage of torture.

Much of the Lorenzen group fled on May 4, 1945 to a cottage in Asserbo in Nordsjælland. Here they were planning to wait for daily life to return to normal in Denmark. A group of 19 men and women were discovered, however, and local resistance fighters with homemade armoured vehicles arrested the group after a heavy shelling of the cottage. Under fire, 2 were killed, 1 committed suicide, 5 were seriously wounded, while the remaining 11 survived with minor injuries.

10 of its members were sentenced to death after the war, including the leader Jørgen Lorenzen who was executed May 10, 1949. Six of these death sentences were however reduced to life imprisonment. The last imprisoned members of the group were released in 1959.

See also
Peter group, pro–German Danish terrorist group
Milice française, Vichy French paramilitary group
Security Battalions, Greek pro-German paramilitary group

References

External links 
Webpage about the Lorenzen group (in Danish)

World War II sabotage
Danish collaborators with Nazi Germany
Paramilitary organizations based in Denmark